The Upper Colorado River Authority or UCRA was created in 1935 by the Texas Legislature as a quasi-governmental entity to manage the Colorado River as a water resource in Tom Green County and Coke County, Texas.  The authority has since been extended to include Schleicher County and Concho County.  The organization is managed by a nine-person Board of Directors appointed to six-year terms by the Governor of Texas.

The UCRA has served as a lending institution, offering loans to municipalities in its served district for water management projects.  The authority also participates in the Clean Rivers Program, and other environmental programs of the state of Texas.  In 2008, the UCRA began construction in San Angelo of the Concho River Basin Education and Research Center, which offers educational programs to schoolchildren about water use and conservation.

Reservoirs 
The Upper Colorado River Authority does not directly manage or operate any dams.  The authority has helped to provide financial and administrative support to other operating authorities to establish three reservoirs on the Upper Colorado River and its tributaries:

 E.V. Spence Reservoir, managed by the Colorado River Municipal Water District
 O.C. Fisher Reservoir, managed by the United States Army Corps of Engineers
 Twin Buttes Reservoir, managed by the City of San Angelo

See also 
 Lower Colorado River Authority
 List of Texas river authorities

References 

Colorado River (Texas)
River authorities of Texas
State agencies of Texas
Companies based in San Angelo, Texas
Government agencies established in 1935
Financial services companies established in 1935
1935 establishments in Texas